Chondroplea populea is a species of fungus belonging to the family Gnomoniaceae.

References

Gnomoniaceae
Taxa named by Pier Andrea Saccardo
Fungi described in 1884